Hankar is a Brussels Metro station on the eastern branch of line 5. It is located in the municipality of Auderghem, in the eastern part of Brussels, Belgium. The station opened in 1976 and is named after the /. This part of line 1A became part of line 5 in April 2009.

The station features a giant mural by Roger Somville.

External links

Brussels metro stations
Railway stations opened in 1976
Auderghem